N. Kayisii is an Indian politician elected to the Manipur Legislative Assembly from Tadubi in 2017 and 2022 Manipur Legislative Assembly election as a member of the National People's Party.He is currently the State Unit President of 
National People's Party of Manipur. He was Minister of Tribal and hill areas department and fisheries (2017-2020) in N. Biren Singh cabinet.

References

1966 births
Living people
Manipur MLAs 2022–2027
People from Senapati district
Manipur MLAs 2017–2022
National People's Party (India) politicians
Naga people